Hospital San Juan de Dios may refer to:

Hospital San Juan de Dios, Bogota, Colombia
San Juan de Dios Hospital (Santiago), Chile
A former hospital in Cúcuta, Colombia, now a library
Hospital San Juan de Dios, Pamplona, Colombia
, San José, Costa Rica

See also
 San Juan de Dios Hospital (Granada)
 San Juan De Dios Hospital (Philippines)
 St John of God Hospital (disambiguation)
 San Juan de Dios Hospital (Peru)